Probolomyrmex is a genus of ants in the subfamily Proceratiinae. The genus is distributed throughout the tropics and subtropics. The ants are very rare, and are rarely collected in the field, but they appear to be nesting in the leaf litter or in rotten wood. Little is known about their biology.

Species

Probolomyrmex aliundus Shattuck, Gunawardene & Heterick, 2012
Probolomyrmex bidens Brown, 1975
Probolomyrmex boliviensis Mann, 1923
Probolomyrmex brevirostris (Forel, 1910)
Probolomyrmex brujitae Agosti, 1995
Probolomyrmex curculiformis Hita Garcia & Fisher, 2014
Probolomyrmex dammermani Wheeler, 1928
Probolomyrmex filiformis Mayr, 1901
Probolomyrmex greavesi Taylor, 1965
Probolomyrmex guanacastensis O'Keefe & Agosti, 1998
Probolomyrmex guineensis Taylor, 1965
Probolomyrmex itoi Eguchi, Yoshimura & Yamane, 2006
Probolomyrmex latalongus Shattuck, Gunawardene & Heterick, 2012
Probolomyrmex longinodus Terayama & Ogata, 1988
Probolomyrmex longiscapus Xu & Zeng, 2000
Probolomyrmex maryatiae Eguchi, Yoshimura & Yamane, 2006
Probolomyrmex newguinensis Shattuck, Gunawardene & Heterick, 2012
Probolomyrmex okinawensis Terayama & Ogata, 1988
Probolomyrmex petiolatus Weber, 1940
Probolomyrmex procne Brown, 1975
Probolomyrmex salomonis Taylor, 1965
Probolomyrmex simplex Shattuck, Gunawardene & Heterick, 2012
Probolomyrmex tani Fisher, 2007
Probolomyrmex vieti Eguchi, Yoshimura & Yamane, 2006
Probolomyrmex watanabei Tanaka, 1974
Probolomyrmex zahamena Hita Garcia & Fisher, 2014

References

External links

Proceratiinae
Ant genera